Chase is a 2010 Indian Hindi-language action film directed by Jag Mundhra, who has previously directed films such as Shoot on Sight and Provoked. The film stars Anuj Saxena, Udita Goswami, Sameer Kochhar and Tareena Patel as the lead roles, while Gulshan Grover makes a special appearance. The film was released on 30, April 2010. The musical score is by Udbhav Ojha and Vijay Verma. With the lyrics are by Jalees Sherwani, Manthan and Prashant Vasl. The title song is sung by Sajid Khan in his funky style. Where the other songs are sung by Shaan, Shreya Ghoshal, and Vasundhara Das. The background musical score is by Amar Mohile.

Plot

The main character in Chase to get to the "truth" is Sohail Ansari (Anuj Saxena), an ex-BSF Commando on the run. DIG Ranveer Tyagi (Rajesh Khattar) has vested interest in getting to the bottom of a murder of the State Industries Minister Vishwajeet Rana in which Sohail is involved and has access to vital information. Inspector Siddharth (Sameer Kochhar) is the right hand of the DIG who is monitoring Sohail's actions. Sohail is chased by Siddharth and the policemen and in the process, Sohail gets badly injured and nabbed. Due to his condition, under the advice of Dr AK Sehgal, (Denzil Smith) Sohail is sent under police protection to the Neurological Research Institute, Panchgani for observation and rehab. In this scenario enters Nupur Chauhan (Udita Goswami) as the nurse to attend to Sohail. She finds out that Sohail is not in a vegetative state but only acting it out. She helps him in escaping from the police. The other players of this Chase are Surabhee (Tareena Patel), who is a TV journalist and also Sohail's love interest and industrialist Anil Khanna (Aditya Raj Kapoor), who is interested to get his Rs 1000 crore Power Plant project approved by the Govt. Added to this there is Anthony D'Costa (Gulshan Grover), who is also in search for the truth. The hunt for Sohail and search for truth takes us through the streets of Mumbai in an exciting and thrilling Chase. The truth has the potential of blowing up the entire political system apart. The line between truth and lies gets blurred. Who is the victim and who is the criminal? What you see may not be the real truth. Do the criminals get caught? Does the victim get justice? Who are Sohail Ansari and Nupur and what is the role of Anthony D'Costa? This Chase for the truth ends in a nail-biting, tense and unusual climax which will leave you spell bound. It is said that you are innocent till proven guilty, but what happens when the law is interested in punishing the accused without verifying his innocence or guilt? What happens when the law upholders are ruthless and have no scruples?

Cast
 Anuj Saxena as Sohail Ansari
 Udita Goswami as Nupur Pradhan
 Geeta Khanna as Rosy Aunty, the rehab nurse
 Aditya Raj Kapoor as Anil Khanna, the industrialist
 Ashok Banthia as Vishwajeet Rana, the Udyog Mantri
 Tareena Patel as Surabhee Patel, TV journalist
 Rajesh Khattar as DIG Ranveer Tyagi
 Gulshan Grover as Anthony D'Costa 
 Sanjay Mishra as Haricharan Dubey, the rehab patient
 Sameer Kochhar as Inspector Siddharth Sharma
 Shweta Menon as Kareena Chopra (in a special appearance as Dubey's hallucination)
 Denzil Smith as Dr. A.K. Sehgal, Dean 
 Ravi Jhankal as Abdul Kareem, antique shop owner
 Nuzhat Siddiqui as the Orphanage nun
 Anil Kumar as the CCTY main operator
 Sunil Tiwari as informer
 Krunal Pandit as Star News reader
 Vishwas Sharma as Pradhan, the new Udyog Mantri

Soundtrack

Box office
Upon release, the film underperformed at the box office and could only collect a total net gross of Rs.  during its first two weeks. It was a commercial failure at the box office in India.

References

External links
 

2010 films
2010s Hindi-language films